Union Sportive Football de Fécamp is a football club based in Fécamp, France. Founded in 1903, it competes in the Régional 2, the seventh tier of the French football pyramid, as of the 2021–22 season. The team plays its home games at the Stade René-Gayant, and the club's colours are red and black.

The club has a women's team that played in the Division 1 Féminine from 1979 to 1982.

History 
Union Sportive Fécampoise was founded in May 1903. In 1935, the club absorbed Sporting Club de Fécamp. 

From 1985 to 1997, Fécamp played in the third tier of French football, initially the Division 3 from 1985 to 1993 and subsequently the Championnat National 1 from 1993 to 1997. In 2002, the club was administratively relegated from the Championnat de France Amateur 2 to the Division d'Honneur. 

The furthest Fécamp has advanced in the Coupe de France is the round of 32, which it has done on four occasions, and most recently in the 1996–97 season.

Honours

References 

Association football clubs established in 1903
1903 establishments in France
Football clubs in France
Sport in Seine-Maritime
Football clubs in Normandy